The many-spotted hummingbird (Taphrospilus hypostictus) is a species of hummingbird in the "emeralds", tribe Trochilini of subfamily Trochilinae. It is found in Bolivia, Colombia, Ecuador, Peru, and possibly Argentina.

Taxonomy and systematics

The many-spotted hummingbird is the only member of genus Taphrospilus and has no subspecies. However, some authors have placed it in genus Talaphorus which others merged into Leucippus.

Description

Adults' upperparts are grass green to coppery bronze and the underparts white. The underparts except the central belly are thickly spotted with green, the female's somewhat less heavily. Their tail is blue-green with dusky gray tips to the feathers. Juveniles are the same with the addition of buffy fringes on the head feathers.

Distribution and habitat

The many-spotted hummingbird's primary range is the eastern slope of the Andes from Ecuador's Napo Province through eastern Peru into central Bolivia. It has also been documented in southern Colombia. The International Ornithological Committee places it Brazil and the Clements taxonomy in Argentina. However, the South American Classification Committee of the American Ornithological Society has no records from Brazil; undocumented sight records from Argentina lead the Committee to list it as hypothetical in that country.

The many-spotted hummingbird inhabits the interior and edges of humid foothill and subtropical forest, favoring small ravines.

Behavior

Movement

The many-spotted hummingbird is a year-round resident throughout its range.

Feeding

The many-spotted hummingbird forages for nectar at a variety of flowering trees, shrubs, vines, and terrestrial bromeliads. It usually does so alone, but at feeders will associate with other hummingbirds. In addition to nectar it feeds on small insects captured by hawking from a perch.

Breeding

The many-spotted hummingbird's breeding season appears to span from January to May. The female incubates the clutch of two eggs for 14 to 15 days and fledging occurs 20 to 22 days after hatch.

Vocalization

The many-spotted hummingbird's song is a "quiet series of wheezy, electric warbles and gravelly-sounding chatters". It also makes calls described as "a thin-sounding 'chit' and a wheezy 'dew dew dew'."

Status

The IUCN has assessed the many-spotted hummingbird as being of Least Concern. It has a large range, but its population size is unknown and believed to be decreasing. No immediate threats have been identified. It is considered generally common, though in Ecuador only "scarce to locally common".

References

many-spotted hummingbird
Birds of the Northern Andes
Hummingbird species of South America
many-spotted hummingbird
Taxonomy articles created by Polbot